The Prendergast Ministry was the 43rd ministry of the Government of Victoria. It was led by the Premier of Victoria, George Prendergast, of the Labor Party. The ministry was sworn in on 18 July 1924. On 12 November 1924, a motion of no-confidence in the Prendergast government was proposed in the Legislative Assembly by John Allan, leader of the Country Party—the motion was carried 34 votes to 28, defeating the government. Allan and his ministry were sworn in on 18 November.

Portfolios

References

Victoria (Australia) ministries
Australian Labor Party ministries in Victoria (Australia)
Ministries of George V
Cabinets established in 1924
Cabinets disestablished in 1924
1924 establishments in Australia
1924 disestablishments in Australia